Gambaga Girls Senior High School is an all female second cycle institution in Gambaga in the Northern Region of Ghana.

History 
The school was established in 2008 by Hajia Alima Mahama, the then Minister for Women and Children's Affairs.

References

High schools in Ghana
Girls' schools in Ghana
Schools in Northern Region (Ghana)
Educational institutions established in 2008
2008 establishments in Ghana